The 2020 Boys' EuroHockey Youth Championships was scheduled to be the 11th edition of the Boys' EuroHockey Youth Championship, the biennial international boys' under-18 field hockey championship of Europe organized by the European Hockey Federation. It was scheduled to be held alongside the women's tournament in Kazan, Russia from 12 to 18 July 2020.

The tournament was canceled on 31 March 2020 due to the COVID-19 pandemic in Europe.

Qualified teams

See also
2020 Girls' EuroHockey Youth Championships

References

Youth
EuroHockey Youth Championships
EuroHockey Youth Championships
EuroHockey Youth Championship